33rd Army may refer to:

33rd Army (Soviet Union)
Thirty-Third Army (Japan), a unit of the Imperial Japanese Armynew